The Mangawhero River is in the North Island of New Zealand. It drains the south-western slopes of Mount Ruapehu, passes through Ohakune before discharging into the Whangaehu River to the south-west of Mangamahu.

History 
The name Mangawhero means comes from the Maori word manga meaning "stream" and whero meaning "red". The river has been used for fishing, agricultural irrigation and domestic water supply.

Course 
The river begins within the area of the Tūroa skifield and flows down the slopes of the mountain in a south west direction. The Ohakune Mountain Road, built during the 1950s and 60s, follows the river valley up to the skifield.

The river continues to flow in a south west direction through the length of Ohakune. There are recreational areas in the town beside the river including walking and cycling trails. Ohakune's water supply is taken from a small tributary of the Mangawhero River, the Tutara (Serpentine) Stream. Treated wastewater from the Ohakune Wastewater Treatment Plant is discharged into the Mangawhero River. This area is a popular fishing spot for brown trout.

The river then turns to flow more southwards as it meanders through farming hill country passing the settlements of Oreore and Kakatahi. The Ruakawa Falls are located on this stretch beside State Highway 4.

As the river continues south the meanders lengthen as the terrain flattens. The rivers terraces in the lower stretches of the river are often irrigated from the river.

In popular culture 
The river was used as a filming location for the 2002 movie The Lord of the Rings: The Two Towers. A section of the river just above Mangawhero Falls was used for a scene where Gollum was fishing.

References

External links
Department of Conservation - short walks in the area of the river

Rivers of Manawatū-Whanganui
Rivers of New Zealand